Płażyński is a surname of Polish origin. Notable people with the surname include:

Kacper Płażyński (born 1989), Polish lawyer and politician
Maciej Płażyński (1958-2010), Polish politician

Surnames of Polish origin